Arkana is an unincorporated community in Bossier Parish, Louisiana, United States.

History
Arkana was named from its location in Louisiana near the Arkansas state line.

References

Unincorporated communities in Bossier Parish, Louisiana
Unincorporated communities in Louisiana
Unincorporated communities in Shreveport – Bossier City metropolitan area